Saint Bridget may refer to:

People
 Brigit of Kildare (451–525), patron saint of Ireland, abbess
 Bridget of Sweden (1303–1373), mystic and saint, founder of the Bridgettines nuns and monks
 Saint Bríga, (fl. 6th century), founder of the monastery of Oughter Ard in Ardclough, County Kildare

Education
 St. Bridget College, Batangas City, Philippines
 St. Bridget School, Quezon City, Philippines
 St Bridget's Primary School, Baillieston, Glasgow

Churches
 Saint Bridget of Ireland Church, Stamford, Connecticut, United States
 Church of Saint Bridget, Liverpool, England
 St. Bridget's Church, Skenfrith, Wales